

Fixtures and results
Scores and results list England's points tally first.

Touring party

Source:

Manager: Jack Rowell
Coaches: Dick Best, Les Cusworth
Captain: Will Carling

Matches

First test
Source:

Notes:
 Hennie le Roux, Fritz van Heerden and Brendan Venter (all South Africa) and Paul Hull (England) made their international test debuts.

Second test
Source:

Notes:
 Mark Andrews, Johan Le Roux and Johan Roux (all South Africa) made their international test debuts.

In popular culture
 The first  test at Loftus Versfeld was referenced in the 2009 film Invictus.

See also
History of rugby union matches between England and South Africa

References

1994 rugby union tours
1994
1993–94 in English rugby union
1994 in South African rugby union